Chairmen of the Chamber of Representatives of the State Assembly of Bashkortostan

Footnotes and references

Lists of legislative speakers in Russia
Chairmen